In mathematics, symmetric cones, sometimes called domains of positivity, are open convex self-dual cones in Euclidean space which have a transitive group of symmetries, i.e. invertible operators that take the cone onto itself. The tube domain associated with a symmetric cone is a noncompact Hermitian symmetric space of tube type. All the algebraic and geometric structures associated with the symmetric space can be expressed naturally in terms of the Jordan algebra. The other irreducible Hermitian symmetric spaces of noncompact type correspond to Siegel domains of the second kind. These can be described in terms of more complicated structures called Jordan triple systems, which generalize Jordan algebras without identity.

Definitions
A convex cone C in a finite-dimensional real inner product space V is a convex set invariant under multiplication by positive scalars. It spans the subspace C – C and the largest subspace it contains is C ∩ (−C). It spans the whole space if and only if it contains a basis. Since the convex hull of the basis is a polytope with non-empty interior, this happens if and only if C has non-empty interior. The interior in this case is also a convex cone. Moreover, an open convex cone coincides with the interior of its closure, since any interior point in the closure must lie in the interior of some polytope in the original cone. A convex cone is said to be proper if its closure, also a cone, contains no subspaces.

Let C be an open convex cone. Its dual is defined as

It is also an open convex cone and C** = C. An open convex cone C is said to be self-dual if C* = C. It is necessarily proper, since
it does not contain 0, so cannot contain both X and −X.

The automorphism group of an open convex cone is defined by

Clearly g lies in Aut C if and only if g takes the closure of C onto itself. So Aut C is a closed subgroup of GL(V) and hence a Lie group. Moreover, Aut C* = (Aut C)*, where g* is the adjoint of g. C is said to be homogeneous if Aut C acts transitively on C.

The open convex cone C is called a symmetric cone if it is self-dual and homogeneous.

Group theoretic properties
If C is a symmetric cone, then Aut C is closed under taking adjoints.
The identity component Aut0 C acts transitively on C.
The stabilizers of points are maximal compact subgroups, all conjugate, and exhaust the maximal compact subgroups of Aut C.
In Aut0 C the stabilizers of points are maximal compact subgroups, all conjugate, and exhaust the maximal compact subgroups of Aut0 C.
The maximal compact subgroups of Aut0 C are connected.
The component group of Aut C is isomorphic to the component group of a maximal compact subgroup and therefore finite.
Aut C ∩ O(V) and Aut0 C ∩ O(V) are maximal compact subgroups in Aut C and Aut0 C.
 C is naturally a Riemannian symmetric space isomorphic to G / K where G = Aut0 C. The Cartan involution is defined by σ(g)=(g*)−1, so that K = G ∩ O(V).

Spectral decomposition in a Euclidean Jordan algebra

In their classic paper,  studied and completely classified a class of finite-dimensional Jordan algebras, that are now called either Euclidean Jordan algebras or formally real Jordan algebras.

Definition
Let E be a finite-dimensional real vector space with a symmetric bilinear product operation

with an identity element 1 such that a1 = a for a in A and a real inner product (a,b) for which the multiplication operators L(a) defined by L(a)b = ab on E are self-adjoint and satisfy the Jordan relation

As will turn out below, the condition on adjoints can be replaced by the equivalent condition that
the trace form Tr L(ab) defines an inner product. The trace form has the advantage of being manifestly invariant under automorphisms of the Jordan algebra, which is thus a closed subgroup of O(E) and thus a compact Lie group. In practical examples, however, it is often easier to produce an inner product for which the L(a) are self-adjoint than verify directly positive-definiteness of the trace form. (The equivalent original condition of Jordan, von Neumann and Wigner was that if a sum of squares of elements vanishes then each of those elements has to vanish.)

Power associativity
From the Jordan condition it follows that the Jordan algebra is power associative, i.e. the Jordan subalgebra generated by any single element a in E is actually an associative commutative algebra. Thus, defining an inductively by an = a (an−1), the following associativity relation holds:

so the subalgebra can be identified with R[a], polynomials in a. In fact polarizing of the Jordan relation—replacing a by a + tb and taking the coefficient of t—yields

This identity implies that L(am) is a polynomial in L(a) and L(a2) for all m. In fact, assuming the result for lower exponents than m,

Setting b = am – 1 in the polarized Jordan identity gives:

a recurrence relation showing inductively that L(am + 1) is a polynomial in L(a) and L(a2).

Consequently, if power-associativity holds when the first exponent is  ≤ m, then it also holds for m+1 since

Idempotents and rank
An element e in E is called an idempotent if e2 = e. Two idempotents are said to be orthogonal if ef = 0. This is equivalent to orthogonality with respect to the inner product,  since (ef,ef) = (e,f). In this case g = e + f is also an idempotent. An idempotent g is called primitive or minimal if it cannot be written as a sum of non-zero orthogonal idempotents. If e1, ..., em are pairwise orthogonal idempotents then their sum is also an idempotent and the algebra they generate consists of all linear combinations of the ei. It is an associative algebra. If e is an idempotent, then 1 − e is an orthogonal idempotent. An orthogonal set of idempotents with sum 1 is said to be a complete set or a partition of 1. If each idempotent in the set is minimal it is called a Jordan frame. Since the number of elements in any orthogonal set of idempotents is bounded by dim E, Jordan frames exist. The maximal number of elements in a Jordan frame is called the rank r of E.

Spectral decomposition
The spectral theorem states that any element a can be uniquely written as

where the idempotents ei's are a partition of 1 and the λi, the eigenvalues of a, are real and distinct. In fact let E0 = R[a] and let T be the restriction of L(a) to E0. T is self-adjoint and has 1 as a cyclic vector. So the commutant of T consists of polynomials in T (or a). By the spectral theorem for self-adjoint operators,

where the Pi are orthogonal projections on E0 with sum I and the λi's are the distinct real eigenvalues of T. Since the   Pi's commute with T and are self-adjoint, they are given by multiplication elements ei of  R[a] and thus form a partition of 1. Uniqueness follows because if fi is a partition of 1 and a = Σ μi fi, then with p(t)=Π (t - μj) and pi = p/(t − μi), fi = pi(a)/pi(μi). So the fi's are polynomials in a and uniqueness follows from uniqueness of the spectral decomposition of T.

The spectral theorem implies that the rank is independent of the Jordan frame. For a Jordan frame with k minimal idempotents can be used to construct an element a with k distinct eigenvalues. As above the minimal polynomial p of a has degree k and R[a] has dimension k. Its dimension is also the largest k such that Fk(a) ≠ 0 where Fk(a) is the determinant of a Gram matrix:

So the rank r is the largest integer k for which Fk is not identically zero on E. In this case, as a non-vanishing polynomial, Fr is non-zero on an open dense subset of E. the regular elements. Any other a is a limit of regular elements a(n). Since the operator norm of L(x) gives an equivalent norm on E, a standard compactness argument shows that, passing to a subsequence if necessary, the spectral idempotents of the a(n) and their corresponding eigenvalues are convergent. The limit of Jordan frames is a Jordan frame, since a limit of non-zero idempotents yields a non-zero idempotent by continuity of the operator norm. It follows that every Jordan frame is made up of r minimal idempotents.

If e and f are orthogonal idempotents, the spectral theorem shows that e and f are polynomials in a = e − f, so that L(e) and L(f) commute. This can be seen directly from the polarized Jordan identity which implies L(e)L(f) = 2 L(e)L(f)L(e). Commutativity follows by taking adjoints.

Spectral decomposition for an idempotent
If e is a non-zero idempotent then the eigenvalues of L(e) can only be 0, 1/2 and 1, since taking a = b = e in the polarized Jordan identity yields

In particular the operator norm of L(e) is 1 and its trace is strictly positive.

There is a corresponding orthogonal eigenspace decomposition of E

where, for a in E, Eλ(a) denotes the λ-eigenspace of L(a). In this decomposition E1(e) and E0(e) are Jordan algebras with identity elements e and 1 − e. Their sum E1(e) ⊕ E0(e) is a direct sum of Jordan algebras in that any product between them is zero. It is the centralizer subalgebra of e and consists of all a such that L(a) commutes with L(e). The subspace E1/2(e) is a module for the centralizer of e, the centralizer module, and the product of any two elements in it lies in the centralizer subalgebra. On the other hand, if

then U is self-adjoint equal to 1 on the centralizer algebra and −1 on the centralizer module. So U2 = I and the properties above show that

defines an involutive Jordan algebra automorphism σ of E.

In fact the Jordan algebra and module properties follow by replacing a and b in the polarized Jordan identity by e and a. If ea = 0, this gives L(e)L(a) = 2L(e)L(a)L(e). Taking adjoints it follows that L(a) commutes with L(e). Similarly if (1 − e)a = 0, L(a) commutes with I − L(e) and hence L(e). This implies the Jordan algebra and module properties. To check that a product of elements in the module lies in the algebra, it is enough to check this for squares: but if L(e)a =  a, then ea =  a, so L(a)2 + L(a2)L(e) = 2L(a)L(e)L(a) + L(a2e). Taking adjoints it follows that L(a2) commutes with L(e), which implies the property for squares.

Trace form
The trace form is defined by

It is an inner product since, for non-zero a = Σ λi ei,

The polarized Jordan identity can be polarized again by replacing a by a + tc and taking the coefficient of t. A further anyisymmetrization in a and c yields:

Applying the trace to both sides

so that L(b) is self-adjoint for the trace form.

Simple Euclidean Jordan algebras

Using the Peirce decomposition, they reduced the problem to an algebraic problem involving multiplicative quadratic forms already solved by Hurwitz. The presentation here, following , using composition algebras or Euclidean Hurwitz algebras, is a shorter version of the original derivation.

Central decomposition
If E is a Euclidean Jordan algebra an ideal F in E is a linear subspace closed under multiplication by elements of E, i.e. F is invariant under the operators L(a) for a in E. If P is the orthogonal projection onto F it commutes with the operators L(a), In particular F⊥ = (I − P)E is also an ideal and E = F ⊕ F⊥. Furthermore, if e = P(1), then P = L(e). In fact for a in E

so that ea = a for a in F and 0 for a in F⊥. In particular e and 1 − e are orthogonal idempotents with L(e) = P and L(1 − e) = I − P. e and 1 − e are the identities in the Euclidean Jordan algebras  F and F⊥. The idempotent e is central in E, where the center of E is defined to be the set of all z such that L(z) commutes with L(a) for all a. It forms a commutative associative subalgebra.

Continuing in this way E can be written as a direct sum of minimal ideals

If Pi is the projection onto Ei and ei = Pi(1) then Pi = L(ei). The ei's are orthogonal with sum 1 and are the identities in Ei. Minimality forces Ei to be simple, i.e. to have no non-trivial ideals. For since L(ei) commutes with all L(a)'s, any ideal F ⊂ Ei
would be invariant under E since F = eiF. Such a decomposition into a direct sum of simple Euclidean algebras is unique. If E = ⊕ Fj is another decomposition, then Fj=⊕ eiFj. By minimality only one of the terms here is non-zero so equals Fj. By minimality the corresponding Ei equals Fj, proving uniqueness.

In this way the classification of Euclidean Jordan algebras is reduced to that of simple ones. For a simple algebra E all inner products for which the operators L(a) are self adjoint are proportional. Indeed, any other product has the form (Ta, b) for some positive self-adjoint operator commuting with the L(a)'s. Any non-zero eigenspace of T is an ideal in A and therefore by simplicity T must act on the whole of E as a positive scalar.

List of all simple Euclidean Jordan algebras

 Let Hn(R) be the space of real symmetric n by n matrices with inner product (a,b) = Tr ab and Jordan product a ∘ b = (ab + ba). Then Hn(R) is a simple Euclidean Jordan algebra of rank n for n ≥ 3.
 Let Hn(C) be the space of complex self-adjoint n by n matrices with inner product (a,b) = Re Tr ab* and Jordan product a ∘ b = (ab + ba). Then Hn(C) is a simple Euclidean Jordan algebra of rank n for n ≥ 3.
 Let Hn(H) be the space of self-adjoint n by n matrices with entries in the quaternions, inner product (a,b) = Re Tr ab* and Jordan product a ∘ b = (ab + ba). Then Hn(H) is a simple Euclidean Jordan algebra of rank n for n ≥ 3.
 Let V be a finite dimensional real inner product space and set E = V ⊕ R with inner product (u⊕λ,v⊕μ) =(u,v) + λμ and product (u⊕λ)∘(v⊕μ)=( μu + λv) ⊕ [(u,v) + λμ]. This is a Euclidean Jordan algebra of rank 2, called a spin factor.   
The above examples in fact give all the simple Euclidean Jordan algebras, except for one exceptional case H3(O), the self-adjoint matrices over the octonions or Cayley numbers, another rank 3 simple Euclidean Jordan algebra of dimension 27 (see below).   

The Jordan algebras H2(R), H2(C), H2(H) and H2(O) are isomorphic to spin factors V ⊕ R where V has dimension 2, 3, 5 and 9, respectively: that is, one more than the dimension of the relevant division algebra.

Peirce decomposition

Let E be a simple Euclidean Jordan algebra with inner product given by the trace form τ(a)= Tr L(a). The proof that E has the above form rests on constructing an analogue of matrix units for a Jordan frame in E. The following properties of idempotents hold in E.

An idempotent e is minimal in E if and only if E1(e) has dimension one (so equals Re). Moreover E1/2(e) ≠ (0).  In fact the spectral projections of any element of E1(e) lie in E so if non-zero must equal e. If the 1/2 eigenspace vanished then  E1(e) = Re would be an ideal.
If e and f are non-orthogonal minimal idempotents, then there is a period 2 automorphism σ of E such that σe=f, so that e and f have the same trace.
If e and f are orthogonal minimal idempotents then E1/2(e) ∩ E1/2(f) ≠ (0). Moreover, there is a period 2 automorphism σ of E such that σe=f, so that e and f have the same trace, and for any a in this intersection, a2 =  τ(e) |a|2 (e + f).
All minimal idempotents in E are in the same orbit of the automorphism group so have the same trace τ0.
If e, f, g are three minimal orthogonal idempotents, then for a in E1/2(e) ∩ E1/2(f) and b in E1/2(f) ∩ E1/2(g), L(a)2 b =  τ0 |a|2 b and |ab|2 =   τ0 |a|2|b|2. Moreover, E1/2(e) ∩ E1/2(f) ∩ E1/2(g) = (0).
If e1, ..., er and f1, ..., fr are Jordan frames in E, then there is an automorphism α such that αei = fi.
If (ei) is a Jordan frame and Eii = E1(ei) and Eij = E1/2(ei) ∩ E1/2(ej), then E is the orthogonal direct sum the Eii's and Eij's. Since E is simple, the Eii's are one-dimensional and the subspaces Eij are all non-zero for i ≠ j.
If a = Σ αi ei for some Jordan frame (ei), then L(a) acts as  αi on Eii and (αi + αi)/2 on Eij.

Reduction to Euclidean Hurwitz algebras

Let E be a simple Euclidean Jordan algebra. From the properties of the Peirce decomposition it follows that:

If E has rank 2, then it has the form V ⊕ R for some inner product space V with Jordan product as described above.
If E has rank r > 2, then there is a non-associative unital algebra A, associative if r > 3, equipped with an inner product satisfying (ab,ab)= (a,a)(b,b) and such that E = Hr(A). (Conjugation in A is defined by a* = −a + 2(a,1)1.)

Such an algebra A is called a Euclidean Hurwitz algebra.  In A if  λ(a)b =  ab and ρ(a)b = ba, then:

 the involution is an antiautomorphism, i.e. 
 
  if 
 

By Hurwitz's theorem A must be isomorphic to R, C, H or O. The first three are associative division algebras. The octonions do not form an associative algebra, so Hr(O) can only give a Jordan algebra for r = 3. Because A is associative when A = R, C or H, it is immediate that Hr(A) is a Jordan algebra for r ≥ 3. There is a later more direct proof using the Freudenthal diagonalization theorem due to : he proved that given any matrix in the algebra Hr(A) there is an algebra automorphism carrying the matrix onto a diagonal matrix with real entries; it is then straightforward to check that [L(a),L(b)] = 0 for real diagonal matrices.

Exceptional and special Euclidean Jordan algebras
The exceptional Euclidean Jordan algebra E= H3(O) is called the Albert algebra. The Cohn–Shirshov theorem implies that it cannot be generated by two elements (and the identity). This can be seen directly. For by Freudenthal's diagonalization theorem one element X can be taken to be a diagonal matrix with real entries and the other  Y to be orthogonal to the Jordan subalgebra generated by X. If all the diagonal entries of X are distinct, the Jordan subalgebra generated by X and Y is generated by the diagonal matrices and three elements

It is straightforward to verify that the real linear span of the diagonal matrices, these matrices and similar matrices with real entries form a unital Jordan subalgebra. If the diagonal entries of X are not distinct, X can be taken to be the primitive idempotent e1 with diagonal entries 1, 0 and 0. The analysis in  then shows that the unital Jordan subalgebra generated by X and Y is proper. Indeed, if 1 − e1 is the sum of two primitive idempotents in the subalgebra, then, after applying an automorphism of E if necessary, the subalgebra will be generated by the diagonal matrices and a matrix orthogonal to the diagonal matrices. By the previous argument it will be proper. If 1 - e1 is a primitive idempotent, the subalgebra must be proper, by the properties of the rank in E.

A Euclidean algebra is said to be special if its central decomposition contains no copies of the Albert algebra. Since the Albert algebra cannot be generated by two elements, it follows that a Euclidean Jordan algebra generated by two elements is special. This is the Shirshov–Cohn theorem for Euclidean Jordan algebras.

The classification shows that each non-exceptional simple Euclidean Jordan algebra is a subalgebra of some Hn(R). The same is therefore true of any special algebra.

On the other hand, as  showed, the Albert algebra H3(O) cannot be realized as a subalgebra of Hn(R) for any n.

Indeed, let π is a real-linear map of E = H3(O) into the self-adjoint operators on V = Rn with π(ab) = (π(a)π(b) + π(b)π(a)) and π(1) = I. If e1, e2, e3 are the diagonal minimal idempotents then Pi = π(ei are mutually orthogonal projections on V onto orthogonal subspaces Vi. If i ≠ j, the elements eij of E with 1 in the (i,j) and (j,i) entries and 0 elsewhere satisfy eij2 = ei + ej. Moreover, eijejk =  eik if i, j and k are distinct. The operators Tij are zero on Vk (k ≠ i, j) and restrict to involutions on Vi ⊕ Vj interchanging Vi and Vj. Letting Pij = Pi Tij Pj and setting Pii = Pi, the (Pij) form a system of matrix units on V, i.e. Pij* = Pji, Σ Pii = I and PijPkm = δjk Pim. Let Ei and Eij be the subspaces of the Peirce decomposition of E. For x in O, set πij =  Pij π(xeij), regarded as an operator on Vi. This does not depend on j and for x, y in O

Since every x in O has a right inverse y with xy = 1, the map πij is injective. On the other hand, it is an algebra homomorphism from the nonassociative algebra O into the associative algebra End Vi, a contradiction.

Positive cone in a Euclidean Jordan algebra

Definition
When (ei) is a partition of 1 in a Euclidean Jordan algebra E, the self-adjoint operators L(ei) commute and there is a decomposition into simultaneous eigenspaces. If a = Σ λi ei the eigenvalues of L(a) have the form Σ εi λi is 0, 1/2 or 1. The ei themselves give the eigenvalues λi. In particular an element a has non-negative spectrum if and only if L(a) has non-negative spectrum. Moreover, a has positive spectrum if and only if L(a) has positive spectrum. For if a has positive spectrum, a - ε1 has non-negative spectrum for some ε > 0.

The positive cone C in E is defined to be the set of elements a such that a has positive spectrum. This condition is equivalent to the operator L(a) being a positive self-adjoint operator on E.

 C is a convex cone in E because positivity of a self-adjoint operator T— the property that its eigenvalues be strictly positive—is equivalent to (Tv,v) > 0 for all v ≠ 0.
 C is an open because the positive matrices are open in the self-adjoint matrices and L is a continuous map: in fact, if the lowest eigenvalue of T is ε > 0, then T + S is positive whenever ||S|| < ε.
 The closure of C consists of all a such that L(a) is non-negative or equivalently a has non-negative spectrum. From the elementary properties of convex cones, C is the interior of its closure and is a proper cone. The elements in the closure of C are precisely the square of elements in E.
 C is self-dual. In fact the elements of the closure of C are just set of all squares x2 in E, the dual cone is given by all a such that (a,x2) > 0. On the other hand, (a,x2) = (L(a)x,x), so this is equivalent to the positivity of L(a).

Quadratic representation
To show that the positive cone C is homogeneous, i.e. has a transitive group of automorphisms, a generalization of the quadratic action of self-adjoint matrices on themselves given by X ↦ YXY has to be defined. If Y is invertible and self-adjoint, this map is invertible and carries positive operators onto positive operators.

For a in E, define an endomorphism of E, called the quadratic representation, by

Note that for self-adjoint matrices L(X)Y = (XY + YX), so that Q(X)Y = XYX.

An element a in E is called invertible if it is invertible in R[a]. If b denotes the inverse, then the spectral decomposition of a shows that L(a) and L(b) commute.

In fact a is invertible if and only if Q(a) is invertible. In that case

Indeed, if Q(a) is invertible it carries R[a] onto itself. On the other hand, Q(a)1 = a2, so

Taking b = a−1 in the polarized Jordan identity, yields

Replacing a by its inverse, the relation follows if L(a) and L(a−1) are invertible. If not it holds for a + ε1 with ε arbitrarily small and hence also in the limit.

These identities are easy to prove in a finite-dimensional (Euclidean) Jordan algebra (see below) or in a special Jordan algebra, i.e. the Jordan algebra defined by a unital associative algebra. They are valid in any Jordan algebra. This was conjectured by Jacobson and proved in : Macdonald showed that if a polynomial identity in three variables, linear in the third, is valid in any special Jordan algebra, then it holds in all Jordan algebras.

In fact for c in A and F(a) a function on A with values in End A, let
DcF(a) be the derivative at t = 0 of F(a + tc). Then

The expression in square brackets simplifies to c because L(a) commutes with L(a−1).

Thus

Applying Dc to L(a−1)Q(a) = L(a) and acting on b = c−1 yields

On the other hand, L(Q(a)b) is invertible on an open dense set where Q(a)b must also be invertible with

Taking the derivative Dc in the variable b in the expression above gives

This yields the fundamental identity for a dense set of invertible elements, so it follows in general by continuity. The fundamental identity implies that c = Q(a)b is invertible if a and b are invertible and gives a formula for the inverse of Q(c). Applying it to c gives the inverse identity in full generality.

Finally it can be verified immediately from the definitions that, if u = 1 − 2e for some idempotent e, then Q(u) is the period 2 automorphism constructed above for the centralizer algebra and module of e.

Homogeneity of positive cone

The proof of this relies on elementary continuity properties of eigenvalues of self-adjoint operators.

Let T(t) (α ≤ t ≤ β) be a continuous family of self-adjoint operators on E with T(α) positive and T(β) having a negative eigenvalue. Set S(t)= –T(t) + M with M > 0 chosen so large that S(t) is positive for all t. The operator norm ||S(t)|| is continuous. It is less than M for t = α and greater than M for t = β. So for some α < s < β, ||S(s)|| = M and there is a vector v ≠ 0 such that S(s)v = Mv. In particular T(s)v = 0, so that T(s) is not invertible.

Suppose that x = Q(a)b does not lie in C. Let b(t) = (1 − t) + tb with 0 ≤ t ≤ 1. By convexity b(t) lies in C. Let x(t) = Q(a)b(t) and X(t) = L(x(t)). If X(t) is invertible for all t with 0 ≤ t ≤ 1, the eigenvalue argument gives a contradiction since it is positive at t = 0 and has negative eigenvalues at t = 1. So X(s) has a zero eigenvalue for some s with 0 < s ≤ 1: X(s)w = 0 with w ≠ 0. By the properties of the quadratic representation, x(t) is invertible for all t. Let Y(t) = L(x(t)2). This is a positive operator since x(t)2 lies in C. Let T(t) = Q(x(t)), an invertible self-adjoint operator by the invertibility of x(t).  On the other hand, T(t) = 2X(t)2 - Y(t). So (T(s)w,w) < 0 since Y(s) is positive and X(s)w = 0. In particular T(s) has some negative eigenvalues. On the other hand, the operator T(0) = Q(a2) = Q(a)2 is positive. By the eigenvalue argument, T(t) has eigenvalue 0 for some t with 0 < t < s, a contradiction.

It follows that the linear operators Q(a) with a invertible, and their inverses, take the cone C onto itself. Indeed, the inverse of Q(a) is just Q(a−1). Since Q(a)1 = a2, there is thus a transitive group of symmetries:

Euclidean Jordan algebra of a symmetric cone

Construction
Let C be a symmetric cone in the Euclidean space E. As above, Aut C denotes the closed subgroup of GL(E) taking C (or equivalently its closure) onto itself. Let G = Aut0 C be its identity component. K = G ∩ O(E). It is a maximal compact subgroup of G and the stabilizer of a point e in C. It is connected. The group G is invariant under taking adjoints. Let σg =(g*)−1,  period 2 automorphism. Thus K is the fixed point subgroup of σ.

Thus ⋅e is an affine subspace of dimension dim . Since C = G/K is an open subspace of E, it follows that dim E = dim  and hence ⋅e = E. For a in E let L(a) be the unique element of   such that L(a)e = a. Define
a ∘ b = L(a)b. Then E with its Euclidean structure and this bilinear product is a Euclidean Jordan algebra with identity 1 = e. The convex cone coincides C with the positive cone of E.

The product is commutative since
[, ] ⊆  annihilates e, so that ab = L(a)L(b)e = L(b)L(a)e = ba. It remains to check the Jordan identity [L(a),L(a2)] = 0.

The associator is given by [a,b,c] = [L(a),L(c)]b. Since [L(a),L(c)] lies in
 it follows that [[L(a),L(c)],L(b)] = L([a,b,c]). Making both sides act on c yields

On the other hand,

and likewise

Combining these expressions gives

which implies the Jordan identity.

Finally the positive cone of E coincides with C. This depends on the fact that in any Euclidean Jordan algebra E

In fact Q(ea) is a positive operator,
Q(eta) is a one-parameter group of positive operators: this follows by continuity for rational t, where it is a consequence of the behaviour of powers So it has the form exp tX for some self-adjoint operator X. Taking the derivative at 0 gives X = 2L(a).

Hence the positive cone is given by all elements

Thus the positive cone of E lies inside C. Since both are self-dual,
they must coincide.

Automorphism groups and trace form
Let C be the positive cone in a simple Euclidean Jordan algebra E. Aut C is the closed subgroup of GL(E) taking C (or its closure) onto itself. Let G = Aut0 C be the identity component of Aut C and let K be the closed subgroup of G fixing 1. From the group theoretic properties of cones, K is a connected compact subgroup of G and equals the identity component of the compact Lie group Aut E. Let  and  be the Lie algebras of G and K. G is closed under taking adjoints and K is the fixed point subgroup of the period 2 automorphism σ(g) = (g*)−1. Thus K = G ∩ SO(E).  Let  be the −1 eigenspace of σ.

 consists of derivations of E that are skew-adjoint for the inner product defined by the trace form.
[[L(a),L(c)],L(b)] = L([a,b,c]).
These derivations span  .
 If a is in C, then Q(a) lies in G.
C is the connected component of the open set of invertible elements of E containing 1. It consists of exponentials of elements of E and the exponential map gives a diffeomorphism of E onto C.
 The map a ↦ L(a) gives an isomorphism of E onto  and eL(a) = Q(ea/2). This space of such exponentials coincides with P the positive self-adjoint elements in G.
 For g in G and a in E, Q(g(a)) = g Q(a) g*.

Cartan decomposition
 G = P ⋅ K = K ⋅ P and the decomposition g = pk corresponds to the polar decomposition in GL(E).
A = exp  is the Abelian subgroup of operators Q(a) where a = Σ λi ei with λi > 0. A is closed in P and hence G. If b =Σ μi ei with μi > 0, then Q(ab)=Q(a)Q(b).

Iwasawa decomposition for cone
If E has Peirce decomposition relative to the Jordan frame (ei)

then   is diagonalized by this decomposition with L(a) acting as (αi + αj)/2 on Eij, where a = Σ αi ei.

Define the closed subgroup S of G by

where the ordering on pairs p ≤  q is lexicographic. S contains the group A, since it acts as scalars on Eij. If N is the closed subgroup of S such that nx = x modulo ⊕(p,q) > (i,j) Epq, then S = AN = NA, a semidirect product with A normalizing N. Moreover, G has the following Iwasawa decomposition:

For i ≠ j let

Then the Lie algebra of N is

Taking ordered orthonormal bases of the Eij gives a basis of E, using the lexicographic order on pairs (i,j). The group N is lower unitriangular and its Lie algebra lower triangular. In particular the exponential map is a polynomial mapping of  onto N, with polynomial inverse given by the logarithm.

Complexification of a Euclidean Jordan algebra

Definition of complexification
Let E be a Euclidean Jordan algebra. The complexification EC = E ⊕ iE has a natural conjugation operation (a + ib)* = a − ib and a natural complex inner product and norm. The Jordan product on E extends bilinearly to EC, so that (a + ib)(c + id) = (ac − bd) + i(ad + bc). If multiplication is defined by L(a)b = ab then the Jordan axiom

still holds by analytic continuation. Indeed, the identity above holds when a is replaced by a + tb for t real; and since the left side is then a polynomial with values in End EC vanishing for real t, it vanishes also t complex. Analytic continuation also shows that all for the formulas involving power-associativity for a single element a in E, including recursion formulas for L(am), also hold in EC. Since for b in E, L(b) is still self-adjoint on EC, the adjoint relation L(a*) = L(a)* holds for a in EC. Similarly the symmetric bilinear form β(a,b) = (a,b*) satisfies β(ab,c) = β(b,ac). If the inner product comes from the trace form, then  β(a,b) = Tr L(ab).

For a in EC, the quadratic representation is defined as before by  Q(a)=2L(a)2 − L(a2). By analytic continuation the fundamental identity still holds:

An element a in E is called invertible if it is invertible in C[a]. Power associativity shows that L(a) and L(a−1) commute. Moreover, a−1 is invertible with inverse a.

As in E, a is invertible if and only if Q(a) is invertible. In that case

Indeed, as for E, if Q(a) is invertible it carries C[a] onto itself, while Q(a)1 = a2, so

so a is invertible. Conversely if a is invertible, taking b = a−2 in the fundamental identity shows that Q(a) is invertible. Replacing a by a−1 and b by a then shows that its inverse is Q(a−1). Finally if a and b are invertible then so is  c = Q(a)b and it satisfies the inverse identity:

Invertibility of c follows from the fundamental formula which gives Q(c) = Q(a)Q(b)Q(a). Hence

The formula

also follows by analytic continuation.

Complexification of automorphism group
Aut EC is the complexification of the compact Lie group Aut E in GL(EC). This follows because the Lie algebras of Aut EC and Aut E consist of derivations of the complex and real Jordan algebras EC and E. Under the isomorphism identifying End EC with the complexification of End E, the complex derivations is identified with the complexification of the real derivations.

Structure groups
The Jordan operator L(a) are symmetric with respect to the trace form, so that L(a)t = L(a) for a in EC. The automorphism groups of E and EC  consist of invertible real and complex linear operators  g such that L(ga) = gL(a)g−1 and g1 = 1. Aut EC is the complexification of Aut E. Since an automorphism g preserves the trace form, g−1 = gt.

The structure groups of E and EC consist of invertible real and complex linear operators  g such that

They form groups  Γ(E) and Γ(EC) with Γ(E) ⊂ Γ(EC).

The structure group is closed under taking transposes g ↦ gt and adjoints  g ↦ g*.
The structure group contains the automorphism group. The automorphism group can be identified with the stabilizer of 1 in the structure group.
If a is invertible, Q(a) lies in the structure group.
If g is in the structure group and a is invertible, ga is also invertible with (ga)−1 = (gt)−1a−1.
 If E is simple, Γ(E) = Aut C × {±1},  Γ(E) ∩ O(E) = Aut E × {±1} and the identity component of Γ(E) acts transitively on C.
 Γ(EC) is the complexification of  Γ(E), which has Lie algebra .
 The structure group Γ(EC)  acts transitively on the set of invertible elements in EC.
 Every g in Γ(EC) has the form g = h Q(a) with h an automorphism and a invertible.

The unitary structure group Γu(EC) is the subgroup of Γ(EC) consisting of unitary operators, so that Γu(EC) = Γ(EC) ∩ U(EC).

 The stabilizer of 1 in Γu(EC) is Aut E.
 Every g in  Γu(EC) has the form g = h Q(u) with h in Aut E and u invertible in EC with u* = u−1.
 Γ(EC) is the complexification of Γu(EC), which has Lie algebra .
 The set S of invertible elements u such that  u* = u−1 can be characterized equivalently either as those u for which L(u) is a normal operator with uu* = 1 or as those u of the form exp ia for some a in E. In particular S is connected.
 The identity component of Γu(EC) acts transitively on S
 g in GL(EC) is in the unitary structure group if and only if gS = S
 Given a Jordan frame (ei) and v in EC, there is an operator u in the identity component of Γu(EC) such that uv = Σ αi ei with αi ≥ 0. If v is invertible, then αi > 0.

Given a frame  in a Euclidean Jordan algebra E, the restricted Weyl group can be identified with the group of operators on  arising from elements in the identity component of Γu(EC) that leave  invariant.

Spectral norm
Let E be a Euclidean Jordan algebra with the inner product given by the trace form. Let (ei) be a fixed Jordan frame in E.  For given a in EC  choose u in Γu(EC) such that
ua = Σ αi ei with αi ≥ 0. Then the spectral norm ||a|| = max αi is independent of all choices. It is a norm on EC with

In addition ||a||2 is given by the operator norm of Q(a) on the inner product space EC. The fundamental identity for the quadratic representation implies that ||Q(a)b|| ≤ ||a||2||b||. The spectral norm of an element a is defined in terms of C[a] so depends only on a and not the particular Euclidean Jordan algebra in which it is calculated.

The compact set S is the set of extreme points of the closed unit ball ||x|| ≤ 1.  Each u in S has norm one. Moreover, if u = eia and v = eib, then ||uv|| ≤ 1. Indeed, by the Cohn–Shirshov theorem the unital Jordan subalgebra of E generated by a and b is special. The inequality is easy to establish in non-exceptional simple Euclidean Jordan algebras, since each such Jordan algebra and its complexification can be realized as a subalgebra of some Hn(R) and its complexification Hn(C) ⊂ Mn(C). The spectral norm in  Hn(C) is the usual operator norm. In that case, for unitary matrices U and V in Mn(C), clearly ||(UV + VU)|| ≤ 1.  The inequality therefore follows in any special Euclidean Jordan algebra and hence in general.

On the other hand, by the Krein–Milman theorem, the closed unit ball is the (closed) convex span of S. It follows that ||L(u)|| = 1, in the operator norm corresponding to either the inner product norm or spectral norm. Hence ||L(a)|| ≤ ||a|| for all a, so that the spectral norm satisfies

It follows that EC is a Jordan C* algebra.

Complex simple Jordan algebras
The complexification of a simple Euclidean Jordan algebra is a simple complex Jordan algebra which is also separable, i.e. its trace form is non-degenerate. Conversely, using the existence of a real form of the Lie algebra of the structure group, it can be shown that every complex separable simple Jordan algebra is the complexification of a simple Euclidean Jordan algebra.

To verify that the complexification of a simple Euclidean Jordan algebra E has no ideals, note that if F is an ideal in EC then so too is F⊥, the orthogonal complement for the trace norm. As in the real case, J = F⊥ ∩ F must equal (0). For the associativity property of the trace form shows that F⊥ is an ideal and that ab = 0 if a and b lie in J. Hence J is an ideal.  But if z is in J, L(z) takes EC into J and J into (0). Hence Tr L(z) = 0.  Since J is an ideal and the trace form degenerate, this forces z = 0.  It follows that EC = F ⊕ F⊥. If P is the corresponding projection onto F, it commutes with the operators L(a) and F⊥ = (I − P)EC. is also an ideal and E = F ⊕ F⊥. Furthermore, if e = P(1), then P = L(e). In fact for a in E

so that ea = a for a in F and 0 for a in F⊥. In particular e and 1 − e are orthogonal central idempotents with L(e) = P and L(1 − e) = I − P.

So simplicity follows from the fact that the center of EC is the complexification of the center of E.

Symmetry groups of bounded domain and tube domain
According to the "elementary approach" to bounded symmetric space of Koecher, Hermitian symmetric spaces of noncompact type can be realized in the complexification of a Euclidean Jordan algebra E as either the open unit ball for the spectral norm, a bounded domain, or as the open tube domain , where C is the positive open cone in E. In the simplest case where E = R, the complexification of E is just C, the bounded domain corresponds to the open unit disk and the tube domain to the upper half plane. This complex Lie group and its maximal compact subgroup  act transitively on the Riemann sphere. The groups are also algebraic. They have distinguished generating subgroups and have an explicit description in terms of generators and relations. Moreover, the Cayley transform gives an explicit Möbius transformation from the open disk onto the upper half plane. All these features generalize to arbitrary Euclidean Jordan algebras. The compactification and complex Lie group are described in the next section and correspond to the dual Hermitian symmetric space of compact type. In this section only the symmetries of and between the bounded domain and tube domain are described.

Jordan frames provide one of the main Jordan algebraic techniques to describe the symmetry groups. Each Jordan frame gives rise to a product of copies of R and C. The symmetry groups of the corresponding open domains and the compactification—polydisks and polyspheres—can be deduced from the case of the unit disk, the upper halfplane and Riemann sphere. All these symmetries extend to the larger Jordan algebra and its compactification. The analysis can also be reduced to this case because all points in the complex algebra (or its compactification) lie in an image of the polydisk (or polysphere) under the unitary structure group.

Definitions
Let  be a Euclidean Jordan algebra with complexification .

 such the ||a|| < 1, i.e. the unit ball for the spectral norm.

Möbius transformations
The group SL(2,C) acts by Möbius transformations on the Riemann sphere C ∪ {∞}, the one-point compactification of C. If g in SL(2,C) is given by the matrix

then

Similarly the group SL(2,R) acts by Möbius transformations on the circle R ∪ {∞}, the one-point compactification of R.

Let k = R or C. Then SL(2,k) is generated by the three subgroups of lower and upper unitriangular matrices, L and U', and the diagonal matrices D. It is also generated by the lower (or upper) unitriangular matrices, the diagonal matrices and the matrix

The matrix J corresponds to the Möbius transformation  and can be written

The Möbius transformations fixing ∞ are just the upper triangular matrices B = UD = DU. If g does not fix ∞, it sends ∞ to a finite point a. But then g can be composed with an upper unitriangular matrix to send a to 0 and then with J to send 0 to infinity. This argument gives the one of the simplest examples of the Bruhat decomposition:

In fact the union is disjoint and can be written more precisely as

where the product occurring in the second term is direct.

Now let

Then

It follows  is generated by the group of operators  and J subject to the following relations:

 is an additive homomorphism
 is a multiplicative homomorphism

This consists of all products
There is a natural homomorphism of Φ onto . Its kernel contain the normal subgroup Δ generated by the relations above. So there is a natural homomorphism of Φ/Δ onto . It is enough to prove the first version, since the more precise version follows from the commutation relations between J and
. The set  is invariant under inversion, contains operators  and J, so it is enough to show it is invariant under multiplication.

. In the first case  fixes one point and hence every point of }, so lies in the center.
since . Since  and  generate the whole group, . But then . The right hand side here is Abelian while the left hand side is its own commutator subgroup.

Given an element a in the complex Jordan algebra , the unital Jordan subalgebra  is associative and commutative. It is invertible in  if and only if it is invertible in
This applies in particular to complex Möbius transformations which can be defined by
. They leave  invariant and, when defined, the group composition law holds.

If  is the projection onto , the action is given be the formula

Cayley transform

The Möbius transformation defined by

is called the Cayley transform. Its inverse is given by

The inverse Cayley transform carries the real line onto the circle with the point 1 omitted. It carries the upper halfplane onto the unit disk and the lower halfplane onto the complement of the closed unit disk. In operator theory the mapping  takes self-adjoint operators T onto unitary operators U not containing 1 in their spectrum. For matrices this follows because unitary and self-adjoint matrices can be diagonalized and their eigenvalues lie on the unit circle or real line. In this finite-dimensional setting the Cayley transform and its inverse establish a bijection between the matrices of operator norm less than one and operators with imaginary part a positive operator.

In the case of matrices, the bijection follows from resolvant formulas.

In particular, setting ,

Equivalently

is a positive operator, so that ||P(T)|| < 1. Conversely if ||U|| < 1 then  is invertible and

Since the Cayley transform and its inverse commute with the transpose, they also establish a bijection for symmetric matrices.

In  the above resolvant identities take the following form:

and equivalently

The inverses here are well defined.

To establish the correspondence, it is enough to check it when  is simple.

The second criterion follows from the fact that if

In fact in this case the relations for a quadratic Jordan algebra imply

so that

The resolvant identity is a special case of the more following more general identity:

In fact

so the identity is equivalent to

The right hand side equals . These are equal because of the formula .

Automorphism group of bounded domain

If  lies in the bounded domain , then  is invertible. Since  is invariant under multiplication by scalars of modulus ≤ 1, it follows that
 is invertible for |λ| ≥ 1. Hence for ||a|| ≤ 1,   is invertible for |λ| > 1. Where defined it is injective. By the maximum modulus principle, to show that  maps  onto  it suffices to show it maps  onto itself. For in that case  and its inverse preserve  so must be surjective. This is a commutative associative algebra and the spectral norm is the supremum norm. Since  with |ςi| = 1, it follows that  where |g(ςi)| = 1.

This is a direct consequence of the definition of the spectral norm.

It follows for diagonal matrices in a fixed component in  because they correspond to transformations in the unitary structure group. Conjugating by a Möbius transformation is equivalent to conjugation by a matrix in that component.

An transformation in  the carries it onto zero. The symmetry  is a biholomorphic Möbius transformation fixing only 0.

But then .

If  is a biholomorphic mapping of  onto itself just fixing 0 then
if , the mapping  fixes 0 and has derivative  there. It is therefore the identity map. So  for any α. This implies g is a linear mapping. Since it maps  onto itself it maps the closure onto itself. In particular it must map the Shilov boundary  onto itself. This forces  to be in the unitary structure group.

 
In fact the only point fixed by (the identity component of) KD in D is 0. Uniqueness implies that the center of GD must fix 0. It follows that the center of GD lies in KD. The center of KD is isomorphic to the circle group: a rotation through θ corresponds to multiplication by eiθ on D so lies in }. Since this group has trivial center, the center of GD is trivial.

In fact any larger compact subgroup would intersect AD non-trivially and it has no non-trivial compact subgroups.

Note that GD is a Lie group (see below), so that the above three statements hold with GD and KD replaced by their identity components, i.e. the subgroups generated by their one-parameter cubgroups. Uniqueness of the maximal compact subgroup up to conjugacy follows from a general argument or can be deduced for classical domains directly using Sylvester's law of inertia following .
The Hermitian form corresponds to an orthogonal decomposition into two subspaces of dimension  both invariant under  with the form positive definite on one and negative definite on the other.

A similar argument, with quaternions replacing the complex numbers, shows uniqueness for the symplectic group, which corresponds to Hermitian matrices over R. This can also be seen more directly by using complex structures. A complex structure is an invertible operator J with J2 = −I preserving the symplectic form B and such that −B(Jx,y) is a real inner product. The symplectic group acts transitively on complex structures by conjugation. Moreover, the subgroup commuting with J is naturally identified with the unitary group for the corresponding complex inner product space. Uniqueness follows by showing that any compact subgroup K commutes with some complex structure J. In fact, averaging over Haar measure, there is a K-invariant inner product on the underlying space. The symplectic form yields an invertible skew-adjoint operator T commuting with K. The operator S = −T2 is positive, so has a unique positive square root, which commutes with K. So J = S−1/2T, the phase of T, has square −I and commutes with K.

Automorphism group of tube domain
There is a Cartan decomposition for GT corresponding to the action on the tube T = E + iC:

KT is the stabilizer of i in iC ⊂ T, so a maximal compact subgroup of GT. Under the Cayley transform, KT corresponds to KD, the stabilizer of 0 in the bounded symmetric domain, where it acts linearly. Since GT is semisimple, every maximal compact subgroup is conjugate to KT.
The center of GT or GD is trivial. In fact the only point fixed by KD in D is 0. Uniqueness implies that the center of GD must fix 0. It follows that the center of GD lies in KD and hence that the center of GT lies in KT. The center of KD is isomorphic to the circle group: a rotation through θ corresponds to multiplication by eiθ on D. In Cayley transform it corresponds to the Möbius transformation z ↦ (cz + s)(−sz  + c)−1 where c = cos θ/2 and s = sin θ/2. (In particular, when θ = π, this gives the symmetry j(z) = −z−1.) In fact all Möbius transformations  z ↦ (αz + β)(−γz  +  δ)−1 with αδ − βγ = 1 lie in GT. Since PSL(2,R) has trivial center, the center of GT is trivial.
 AT is given by the linear operators Q(a) with a = Σ αi ei with  αi > 0.

Since ||z|| < 1, it follows that . Since
 with
Hence .

3-graded Lie algebras

Iwasawa decomposition
There is an Iwasawa decomposition for GT corresponding to the action on the tube T = E + iC:

KT is the stabilizer of i in iC ⊂ T.
 AT is given by the linear operators Q(a) where a = Σ αi ei with  αi > 0.
 NT is a lower unitriangular group on EC. It is the semidirect product of the unipotent triangular group N appearing in the Iwasawa decomposition of G (the symmetry group of C) and N0 = E, group of translations x ↦ x + b.

The group S = AN acts on E linearly and conjugation on N0 reproduces this action. Since the group S acts simply transitively on C, it follows that ANT=S⋅N0 acts simply transitively on T = E + iC.  Let HT be the group of biholomorphisms of the tube T. The Cayley transform shows that is isomorphic to the group HD of biholomorphisms of the bounded domain D. Since ANT acts simply transitively on the tube T while KT fixes ic, they have trivial intersection.

Given g in HT, take s in  ANT such that g−1(i)=s−1(i). then gs−1  fixes i and therefore lies in KT. Hence HT = KT ⋅A⋅NT. So the product is a group.

Lie group structure
By a result of Henri Cartan, HD is a Lie group. It can also be deduced from the fact the D is complete for the Bergman metric, for which the isometries form a Lie group; by Montel's theorem, the group of biholomorphisms is a closed subgroup.

That HT is a Lie group can be seen directly in this case. In fact there is a finite-dimensional 3-graded Lie algebra   of vector fields with an involution σ. The Killing form is negative definite on the +1 eigenspace of σ  and positive definite on the −1 eigenspace. As a group HT  normalizes  since the two subgroups KT and ANT do. The +1 eigenspace corresponds to the Lie algebra of KT. Since the group GT has trivial center, the map into GL() is injective. Since KT is compact, its image in GL() is compact. Since the Lie algebra  is compatible with that of ANT, the image of ANT is closed. Hence the image of the product is closed, since the image of KT is compact. Since it is a closed subgroup, it follows that HT is a Lie group.

Generalizations
Euclidean Jordan algebras can be used to construct Hermitian symmetric spaces of tube type. The remaining Hermitian symmetric spaces are Siegel domains of the second kind. They can be constructed using Euclidean Jordan triple systems, a generalization of Euclidean Jordan algebras. In fact for a Euclidean Jordan algebra E let

Then L(a,b) gives a bilinear map into End E such that

and

Any such bilinear system is called a Euclidean Jordan triple system. By definition the operators L(a,b) form a Lie subalgebra of End E.

The Kantor–Koecher–Tits construction gives a one-one correspondence between Jordan triple systems and 3-graded Lie algebras

satisfying

and equipped with an involutive automorphism σ reversing the grading. In this case

In the case of Euclidean Jordan algebras or triple systems the Kantor–Koecher–Tits construction can be identified with the Lie algebra of the Lie group of all homomorphic automorphisms of the corresponding bounded symmetric domain.

and the involution by

The Killing form is given by

where β(T1,T2) is the symmetric bilinear form defined by

These formulas, originally derived for Jordan algebras, work equally well for Jordan triple systems.
The account in  develops the theory of bounded symmetric domains starting from the standpoint of 3-graded Lie algebras. For a given finite-dimensional vector space E, Koecher considers finite-dimensional Lie algebras  of vector fields on E with polynomial coefficients of degree ≤ 2.  consists of the constant vector fields ∂i and  must contain the Euler operator H = Σ xi⋅∂i as a central element. Requiring the existence of an involution σ leads directly to a Jordan triple structure on V as above. As for all Jordan triple structures, fixing c in E,
the operators Lc(a) = L(a,c) give E a Jordan algebra structure, determined by e. The corresponding Weyl group element implements the involution σ. This case corresponds to that of Euclidean Jordan algebras.

The remaining cases are constructed uniformly by Koecher using involutions of simple Euclidean Jordan algebras. Let E be a simple Euclidean Jordan algebra and τ a Jordan algebra automorphism of E of period 2. Thus E = E+1 ⊕ E−1 has an eigenspace decomposition for τ with E+1 a Jordan subalgebra and E−1 a module. Moreover, a product of two elements in E−1 lies in E+1. For a, b, c in E−1, set

and (a,b)= Tr L(ab). Then F = E−1 is a simple Euclidean Jordan triple system, obtained by restricting the triple system on E to F.  Koecher exhibits explicit involutions of simple Euclidean Jordan algebras directly (see below). These Jordan triple systems correspond to irreducible Hermitian symmetric spaces given by Siegel domains of the second kind. In Cartan's listing, their compact duals are SU(p + q)/S(U(p) × U(q)) with p ≠ q (AIII), SO(2n)/U(n) with n odd (DIII) and E6/SO(10) × U(1) (EIII).

Examples
F is the space of p by q matrices over R with p ≠ q. In this case L(a,b)c= abtc + cbta with inner product (a,b) = Tr abt. This is Koecher's construction for the involution on E = Hp + q(R) given by conjugating by the diagonal matrix with p digonal entries equal to 1 and q to −1.
F is the space of real skew-symmetric m by m matrices. In this case L(a,b)c = abc + cba with inner product (a,b) = −Tr ab. After removing a factor of √(-1), this is Koecher's construction applied to complex conjugation on E = Hn(C).
F is the direct sum of two copies of the Cayley numbers, regarded as 1 by 2 matrices. This triple system is obtained by Koecher's construction for the canonical involution defined by any minimal idempotent in E = H3(O).

The classification of Euclidean Jordan triple systems has been achieved by generalizing the methods of Jordan, von Neumann and Wigner, but the proofs are more involved.

Notes

References 

 
 
 
 
 
 
 
  (reprint of 1951 article)
 
 
 
 
 
 
 
 
 
 
 
 
 
 
 
 
 
 
 
 
 
 
 
 
  
 , originally lecture notes from a course given in the University of Göttingen in 1962
 
 
 

Convex geometry
Non-associative algebras
Lie algebras
Lie groups
Several complex variables